Roy Stewart (15 May 1925 – 27 October 2008) was a Jamaican-born British actor. He began his career as a stuntman and went on to work in film and television.

In 1954 he founded Roy Stewart's Gym in Powis Square, North Kensington, and ran the Caribbean club and restaurant The Globe, in Talbot Road until his death. Stewart played Quarrel Junior in the James Bond film Live and Let Die (1973). Other film appearances include Carry On Up the Jungle (1970), Leo the Last (1970), Games That Lovers Play (1971), Twins of Evil (1971), Lady Caroline Lamb (1972), Stand Up, Virgin Soldiers (1977) and Arabian Adventure (1979). He was also active on television, with credits including: Out of the Unknown, Adam Adamant Lives!, Doctor Who (in the serials The Tomb of the Cybermen and Terror of the Autons), Doomwatch, Up Pompeii!, The Troubleshooters, Space: 1999 and I, Claudius.

Early life
One of seven brothers, Roy Stewart was born in Jamaica, and came to Britain in 1948 with aspirations of being a doctor. But either theatre or a television commercial changed that.

Film and television career
In a role, possibly his earliest, Stewart appeared in a television advert for Fry's Turkish Delight, playing a snake charmer. Later, he was an extra in films and did stunt work. He would become one of the top black actors and stuntmen in Britain.

Film
Possibly his earliest role was an uncredited one, playing a slave in the 1959 film, The Mummy. In 1973, he played the part of Quarrel Junior in the James Bond film Live and Let Die starring Roger Moore. Having not returned for many years to Jamaica where the film was being shot, Stewart suffered in the heat and couldn't believe the changes that had taken place over the years.

One of his last roles in film was as Pomeroy in Dangerous Davies: The Last Detective, a 1981 made-for-television movie.

Television
He appeared in Doctor Who twice. He played Toberman in The Tomb of the Cybermen and Tony in Terror of the Autons.

Television commercials
 Fry's Turkish Delight
 Surf washing powder

Business interests
Stewart ran a basement gymnasium at 32A Powis Square, Kensington, west London which was opened in 1954. It had the policy of allowing all races to train there. Some actors trained there too, one of them, David Prowse, a Commonwealth Games weightlifter in 1962, went on to play Darth Vader in the film Star Wars. The Gymnasium had a dual purpose. It was also an unofficial after-hours drinking club. By 1964, Stewart had been convicted four times for selling liquor without a license. He also ran a nightclub in Bayswater. Jimi Hendrix, Van Morrison and Bob Marley were some of the patrons.

The Globe
In the 1960s he opened a Caribbean restaurant and bar called The Globe. The Globe, formerly Bajy's, was located at 103 Talbot Road. Jimi Hendrix was reportedly seen there the night before his death in September 1970. Stewart ran The Globe until he died in October 2008.
The Globe functions to this day and is one of longest-running nightclubs in London. It also has a Caribbean restaurant upstairs.

Death

Having suffered for some time from heart disease, Stewart died on 27 October 2008, aged 83.

Filmography

References

External links
 

1925 births
2008 deaths
British male film actors
British male television actors
Black British male actors
Migrants from British Jamaica to the United Kingdom